Ousseini Djibo Idrissa (born 28 December 1998) is a Nigerien sprinter. He competed in the men's 400 metres at the 2016 Summer Olympics.

References

1998 births
Living people
Nigerien male sprinters
Olympic athletes of Niger
Athletes (track and field) at the 2016 Summer Olympics
Place of birth missing (living people)